David Kramer may refer to:

 David Kramer (singer) (born 1951), South African singer, songwriter, playwright and director
 David Kramer (soccer) (born 1972), retired American soccer goalkeeper
 David Kramer (talent agent) (born 1969), American talent agency executive
 David J. Kramer, United States Assistant Secretary of State for Democracy, Human Rights, and Labor, 2008–2009
 David M. Kramer (biophysicist) (born 1961), American biophysicist
 David M. Kramer (politician) (born 1920?), American politician from New York
 David Krämer (born 1997), German professional basketball player